The Coronation is a 2018 British television documentary made to commemorate the 65th anniversary of the coronation of Elizabeth II.

It was broadcast on BBC One in the United Kingdom on 14 January 2018. The documentary also aired on the Smithsonian Channel in the United States on the same day, and was shown on ABC in Australia on 4 February 2018. It was made by Atlantic Productions and distributed by FremantleMedia International.

In the hour-long documentary, Queen Elizabeth II speaks candidly to Alastair Bruce of Crionaich, royal commentator for Sky News, about her experience of the coronation and some of the Crown Jewels used in the ceremony. The Queen had never been interviewed on camera, and the exchange, which often seemed like an interview, was officially described as a "conversation".

References

External links
Trailer for the documentary
Royal Regalia – commentary on the regalia by Anna Keay
Imperial State Crown a clip from the documentary

2018 television specials
2018 in British television
Documentary films about British royalty
Films about Elizabeth II
BBC television documentaries about history during the 20th Century